WBTQ is an active rock formatted broadcast radio station licensed to Weston, West Virginia, serving North Central West Virginia. WBTQ is owned and operated by West Virginia Radio Corporation.

On January 31, 2018, the then-WFBY changed their format from classic rock (which moved to 93.5 FM Buckhannon) to a simulcast of active rock-formatted WCLG-FM 100.1 Morgantown under new WBTQ calls.

Previous logo

References

External links
WBTQ Online

1972 establishments in West Virginia
Radio stations established in 1972
BTQ
Active rock radio stations in the United States